The Memphis & Arkansas Bridge, also known as the Memphis–Arkansas Bridge or inaccurately as the Memphis–Arkansas Memorial Bridge, is a cantilevered through truss bridge carrying Interstate 55 across the Mississippi River between West Memphis, Arkansas and Memphis, Tennessee. Memphians refer to this bridge as the "Old Bridge" to distinguish it from the "New Bridge", or Hernando de Soto Bridge, upstream.

The Memphis & Arkansas Bridge also carries U.S. Route 61 (US 61), US 64, US 70 and US 79 from Memphis to West Memphis; it also carried US 63 prior to its truncation (and later rerouting) in Arkansas. The western terminus of Tennessee State Route 1 (SR 1) sits on the Tennessee–Arkansas boundary halfway across the bridge.

Description
Completed in 1949, it is the only bridge spanning the Mississippi River designed to carry exclusively vehicular traffic that was built before 1950. It was designed by Modjeski and Masters, successors to the firm that designed the Harahan Bridge, built in 1916 to carry vehicular and rail traffic. The bridge was listed on the National Register of Historic Places in 2001.

Built before the introduction of the Interstate Highway System, the span was not built to Interstate Highway standards; it originally lacked the concrete barrier between the different directions of traffic which, was added later. It was also built with a sidewalk on either side of the roadway, positioned just outside the steel truss girders. The sidewalks, now also separated from the traffic lanes by concrete barriers, are accessible from Memphis city sidewalks on the Tennessee side, but give way to grassy slopes on the shoulders of I-55 on the Arkansas side.

The sidewalk and bridge is listed as part of the Mississippi River Trail. However, travel is not recommended across the sidewalk and is prohibited on the vehicle traffic lanes of the bridge, as the structure is an Interstate Highway crossing. In 2016, a pedestrian/bicycle path on the neighboring Harahan Bridge made crossing the river safer and eliminated the need to use the I-55 bridge.

Despite common references to this bridge as a "Memorial Bridge", most likely resulting from its opening shortly after World War II, there is no evidence that this bridge was ever intended to be a memorial to anything. There is no mention of any memorial intent on the bridge's nameplates, including a dedicatory poem on one nameplate (officially attributed to Walter Chandler) that appears to focus on the traffic expected to cross the bridge rather than any memorial. (This is in contrast to the Harahan Bridge, which was named for a railroad executive who died in an accident during the bridge's construction.) Crump himself, for whom the boulevard originally leading to the bridge was named, lived until 1954; Chandler lived until 1967.

Bridge history

Planning and construction
The Memphis & Arkansas Bridge was inspired by the ever increasing flow of traffic on the single-lane cantilevered "wagonways" of the Harahan Bridge from its opening in 1916 all the way to this bridge's opening in 1949. This increased traffic led to the incorporation of West Memphis, Arkansas in 1927 where the Arkansas roadways leading to the Harahan Bridge came together, as well as the 1930 replacement by the Arkansas State Highway Commission (ASHC), the modern-day version of which oversees the Arkansas Department of Transportation, of the original wooden viaduct leading from West Memphis to the Harahan Bridge. Most of the 1930 viaduct was reused for the Memphis & Arkansas Bridge until the present I-55 viaduct replaced it in the 1980's; a small portion of that viaduct now serves as the Arkansas entrance to the Harahan Bridge's Big River Crossing (built on one of its former "wagonways").

Planning for the new bridge began in 1939 with the creation of a joint Memphis-Arkansas bridge commission headed by longtime Memphis political boss E. H. Crump. Walter Chandler, another notable Tennessee politician who was a member of the Crump machine at that time, also served on the bridge commission. Simultaneously with the bridge, Crump planned a new bypass street leading to the bridge, avoiding both downtown Memphis and historic African American neighborhoods to the south, which came to be known as Crump Boulevard. Aretha Franklin was born on Lucy Avenue, in just such a neighborhood south of Crump Boulevard, in 1942 before moving eventually to Detroit where she became famous as the Queen of Soul.

By May 1944, the ASHC and Tennessee's Department of Highway and Public Works (now the Tennessee Department of Transportation or TDOT) hired Modjeski and Masters, the firm founded by Ralph Modjeski who designed the Harahan Bridge in 1916 and helped design the area's original Frisco Bridge in 1892, to prepare plans for this bridge even though Modjeski himself died in 1940. Though truss bridges increasingly fell out of fashion after World War II, this bridge's truss design, especially its main span, was largely dictated by the neighboring Frisco & Harahan Bridges and the established navigation channel beneath them. Construction on the bridge began on September 12, 1945, and the bridge opened to traffic on December 17, 1949.

Later history
Though Crump Boulevard was originally intended to serve as the main access to the bridge from Memphis, TDOT replaced the west end of Crump Boulevard with a stretch of I-55 in the 1960's. The issues resulting from the cloverleaf interchange at I-55 and Crump, required to accommodate a 90-degree change in I-55's direction onto the bridge, have led to more recent traffic problems including a failed TDOT plan that would have required a long-term closure of I-55 and the bridge in order to reconstruct the interchange, as well as lane closures and other issues at the interchange during the 2021 I-40 bridge closure during which this was the only open bridge at Memphis.

 On August 12, 2012, a cyclist was killed after being struck by a vehicle when using the shoulder approaching the bridge. On December 23, 2014, numerous news sources reported that the FBI had released an official statement warning local law enforcements of a threat to the bridge during that month. The FBI stated, "according to an anonymous complainant... ISIS instructed an ISIS member, a presumed USPER (U.S. person) in Memphis, with a direct order to blow up the Memphis–Arkansas bridge on an unknown date, activating ISIS terror cells in the United States." Security was heightened, but the threat was later discredited.

Traffic mix
Annual average daily traffic (AADT) figures reported by the Tennessee Department of Transportation for 2018, three years before the notable 2021 closure of the I-40 Hernando de Soto Bridge or "new bridge", show that the I-55 "old bridge" carries substantially more vehicles (64,520) than the I-40 bridge (37,308) despite its being older and narrower. Meanwhile, similar figures reported by the Arkansas Department of Transportation for 2020, the year before the I-40 bridge closure, from devices that also measure percentage of truck traffic suggest that though the I-40 bridge had slightly more vehicles (47,000) than the I-55 bridge (45,000), the I-55 bridge actually had a higher percentage of truck traffic (37 percent) than the I-40 bridge (26 percent).

These figures, seemingly incongruous especially after the issues caused by the 2021 I-40 bridge closure which forced all traffic crossing the river at Memphis (including trucks) to use this bridge, may be explainable by way of the routing of I-40, I-55 and U.S. 78 (supplanted in part by I-22 and its connecting freeway I-269) thru the Memphis area, as well as the locations of major distribution and transportation hubs in the area ranging from the FedEx Express "super hub" at Memphis International Airport to regional grocery warehouses operated by Kroger  and Associated Wholesale Grocers . Despite the U.S. Supreme Court's landmark 1971 decision in Citizens to Preserve Overton Park v. Volpe that led to the cancellation of I-40's originally planned route thru Overton Park (which in part dictated the location of the I-40 bridge), the advantages of I-40 as a cross-country interstate proved to be undeniable; thus the I-40 bridge is used by long-haul truckers & other cross-country travelers, as well as by commuters from Arkansas going to & from jobs in downtown Memphis which is generally closer to that bridge. Meanwhile, most Memphis area distribution and transportation hubs are in the southern part of Memphis and its Mississippi suburbs such as Southaven and Olive Branch, with ready access to I-55 via such routes as I-240 across south Memphis (not to be confused with the I-240 in north Memphis that became I-40 after the Overton Park cancellation), U.S. 78, I-22 and I-269; thru truck traffic to & from Birmingham, Alabama and points east (such as Atlanta) also flows thru Mississippi & south Memphis via U.S. 78, I-22, I-269 and I-55. Finally, though both I-40 and I-55 go thru Memphis, they actually cross in West Memphis, Arkansas and not Memphis proper; the rerouting of I-40, along with both the original and current designs of its interchange with I-240 west of Overton Park, do not facilitate high volumes of trucks from the south seeking to use the I-40 bridge. Thus, it is generally easier for trucks going between Memphis (as well as Birmingham via U.S. 78 / I-22) and points west of Memphis, ranging from Arkansas grocery stores all the way to Los Angeles, to use this bridge to reach I-40 at West Memphis rather than the I-40 bridge itself, on top of the expected traffic using I-55 (and in some cases I-57 further north) to reach St. Louis, Chicago and other major Northern cities.

In popular culture
The bridge can be seen in scenes of the 1989 film Great Balls of Fire! starring Dennis Quaid as Jerry Lee Lewis.

The bridge is referenced in the Chuck Berry song "Memphis, Tennessee," where it is simply called "the Mississippi bridge."

See also 

 List of crossings of the Lower Mississippi River
 List of bridges on the National Register of Historic Places in Arkansas
 List of bridges on the National Register of Historic Places in Tennessee
 National Register of Historic Places listings in Crittenden County, Arkansas
 National Register of Historic Places listings in Shelby County, Tennessee

References

External links

Bridges completed in 1949
Bridges over the Mississippi River
Bridges in Memphis, Tennessee
Interstate 55
U.S. Route 61
Road bridges on the National Register of Historic Places in Arkansas
Transportation in Crittenden County, Arkansas
Buildings and structures in West Memphis, Arkansas
Road bridges on the National Register of Historic Places in Tennessee
U.S. Route 64
U.S. Route 70
U.S. Route 79
Bridges on the Interstate Highway System
Great River Road
U.S. Route 63
Bridges of the United States Numbered Highway System
National Register of Historic Places in Crittenden County, Arkansas
Steel bridges in the United States
Cantilever bridges in the United States
Warren truss bridges in the United States
Interstate vehicle bridges in the United States
1949 establishments in Tennessee
1949 establishments in Arkansas